The Maton–Hunt–Farnum Farm (also known as the Pardon Hunt Farm) is an historic farm on Putnam Pike in Glocester, Rhode Island.  The main house is a -story wood-frame structure, five bays wide, with a gable roof and a central chimney, and is set on the north side of Putnam Pike.  Behind the house are a number of farm outbuildings, including two barns, henhouses, a corn crib, and a privy.  Built c. 1793 by Daniel Manton, the house exhibits fine Federal styling both inside and outside.

The property was listed on the National Register of Historic Places in 1985.

See also
National Register of Historic Places listings in Providence County, Rhode Island

References

Houses completed in 1793
Farms on the National Register of Historic Places in Rhode Island
Federal architecture in Rhode Island
Houses in Providence County, Rhode Island
Buildings and structures in Glocester, Rhode Island
National Register of Historic Places in Providence County, Rhode Island
1793 establishments in Rhode Island